Ilek-Penkovka is a rural locality (a settlement) and the administrative center of Ilek-Penkovskoye Rural Settlement, Krasnoyaruzhsky District, Belgorod Oblast, Russia. The population was 750 as of 2010. There are 14 streets.

Geography 
Ilek-Penkovka is located 10 km southwest of Krasnaya Yaruga (the district's administrative centre) by road. Zadorozhny is the nearest rural locality.

References 

Rural localities in Krasnoyaruzhsky District